Connor Creek is a locality in Alberta, Canada.

Connor Creek has the name of James Connor, a pioneer citizen.

References 

Localities in Lac Ste. Anne County